Sporle Priory was a priory in Norfolk, England. It was founded in the early 12th century, and given to the monks of St. Florent free-of-charge as an alien priory. It was vacant for some time after the Black Death, and was dissolved in 1424.

References 

Monasteries in Norfolk